The 2016 Special Honours in New Zealand were two Special Honours Lists, published in New Zealand on 27 June and 24 August 2016. Appointments were made to the New Zealand Order of Merit and the Queen's Service Order to recognise the incoming governor-general, Dame Patsy Reddy, and the outgoing vice-regal consort, Janine, Lady Mateparae.

In addition, a third Special Honours List was published on 1 August, promulgating the 2016 New Zealand bravery awards.

New Zealand Order of Merit

Dame Grand Companion (GNZM)
Additional
 Dame Patricia Lee Reddy  – Governor-General Designate

Companion of the Queen's Service Order (QSO)
Additional
 Janine Elizabeth, Lady Mateparae
 Dame Patricia Lee Reddy  – Governor-General Designate

References

Special honours
Special honours